Verkhososna is a rural locality (a selo) and the administrative center of Verkhnesosenskoye Rural Settlement, Krasnogvardeysky District, Belgorod Oblast, Russia. The population was 1,069 as of 2010. There are 14 streets.

Geography 
Verkhososna is located 23 km northwest of Biryuch (the district's administrative centre) by road. Zavalskoye is the nearest rural locality.

References 

Rural localities in Krasnogvardeysky District, Belgorod Oblast